A war memorial is a building, monument, statue, or other edifice to celebrate a war or victory, or (predominating in modern times) to commemorate those who died or were injured in a war.

Symbolism

Historical usage

It has been suggested that the world's earliest known war memorial is the White Monument at Tell Banat, Aleppo Governorate, Syria, which dates from the 3rd millennium BC and appears to have involved the systematic burial of fighters from a state army.

The Nizari Ismailis of the Alamut period (the Assassins) had made a secret roll of honor in Alamut Castle containing the names of the assassins and their victims during their uprising.

The oldest war memorial in the United Kingdom is Oxford University's All Souls College. It was founded in 1438 with the provision that its fellows should pray for those killed in the long wars with France.

War memorials for the Franco-Prussian War (1870–71) were the first in Europe to have rank-and-file soldiers commemorated by name. Every soldier that was killed was granted a permanent resting-place as part of the terms of the Treaty of Frankfurt (1871).

To commemorate the millions who died in World War I, war memorials became commonplace in communities large and small around the world.

Modern usage
In modern times the main intent of war memorials is not to glorify war, but to honor those who have died. Sometimes, as in the case of the Warsaw Genuflection of Willy Brandt, they may also serve as focal points of increasing understanding between previous enemies.

Using modern technology an international project is currently archiving all post-1914 Commonwealth war graves and Commonwealth War Graves Commission memorials to create a virtual memorial (see The War Graves Photographic Project for further details).

History

World War I

During WWI, many nations saw massive devastation and loss of life. More people lost their lives in the east than in the west, but the outcome was different.  In the west, and in response to the victory there obtained, most of the cities in the countries involved in the conflict erected memorials, with the memorials in smaller villages and towns often listing the names of each local soldier who had been killed in addition (so far as the decision by the French and British in 1916 to construct governmentally designed cemeteries was concerned) to their names being recorded on military headstones, often against the will of those directly involved, and without any opportunity of choice in the British Empire (whose war graves were administered by the Imperial War Graves Commission). Massive British monuments commemorating thousands of dead with no identified war grave, such as the Menin Gate at Ypres and the Thiepval memorial on the Somme, were also constructed.

The Liberty Memorial, located in Kansas City, Missouri, is a memorial dedicated to all Americans who served in the Great War. For various reasons connected with their character, the same may be said to apply to certain governmental memorials in the United Kingdom (The Cenotaph in London, relating to the Empire in general, and the Scottish National War Memorial in Edinburgh, also with a reference to the Empire, but with particular connections to the United Kingdom, having been opened by the Prince of Wales in 1927 and with the King and the Queen the first visitors and contributors of a casket of the Scottish names for addition within the Shrine). In Maryland, in the center of the city of Baltimore facing the Baltimore City Hall to the west is a geometric paved tree-lined plaza with the War Memorial Building to the east with a large marble decorated civic auditorium and historical and veterans museum below, designed by Laurence Hall Fowler, dedicated 1925.

Pacifist war memorials and those relating to war and peace
After World War I, some towns in France set up pacifist war memorials. Instead of commemorating the glorious dead, these memorials denounce war with figures of grieving widows and children rather than soldiers. Such memorials provoked anger among veterans and the military in general. The most famous is at Gentioux-Pigerolles in the department of Creuse. Below the column which lists the name of the fallen stands an orphan in bronze pointing to an inscription 'Maudite soit la guerre' (Cursed be war). Feelings ran so high that the memorial was not officially inaugurated until 1990 and soldiers at the nearby army camp were under orders to turn their heads when they walked past. Another such memorial is in the small town of Équeurdreville-Hainneville (formerly Équeurdreville) in the department of Manche. Here the statue is of a grieving widow with two small children.

There seems to be no exact equivalent form of a pacifist memorial within the United Kingdom but evidently sentiments were in many cases identical. Thus, and although it seems that this has never been generally recognized, it can be argued that there was throughout the United Kingdom a construction of war memorials with reference to the concept of peace (e.g. West Hartlepool War Memorial in what is now known as Hartlepool (previously West Hartlepool) with the inscription 'Thine O Lord is the Victory' relating to amongst other architecture the 1871 Royal Albert Hall of Arts and Sciences with a frieze including the same words and concluding 'Glory be to God on high and on earth peace').

World War II and later
In many cases, World War I memorials were later extended to show the names of locals who died in the World War II in addition.

Since that time memorials to the dead in other conflicts such as the Korean War and Vietnam War have also noted individual contributions, at least in the West.

In relation to actions which may well in point of fact be historically connected with the world wars even if this happens, for whatever reason, not to be a matter of general discussion (e.g. occupation by Western forces in the 1920s of Palestine and other areas being the homelands of Arabs in the Near East and followed eighty years later in 2001 by the '9/11' raid on New York and elsewhere in the United States) similar historically and architecturally significant memorials are also designed and constructed (vide National September 11 Memorial).

Types
 War memorials can differ significantly in type and composition.  Many war memorials often take the form of a traditional monument or statue, while others consist of entire buildings, often containing a museum, while yet others are simple plaques.  War memorials can take a variety of other forms, including, but not limited to, commemorative gardens, stadiums, eternal flames, urban plazas, stained glass windows, gateways, fountains and/or pools of water, military equipment, and parks.
 War memorials often serve as a meeting place for commemorative services. As such, they are often found near the centre of town, or contained in a park or plaza to allow easy public access.
 Many war memorials bear plaques listing the names of those that died in battle. Sometimes these lists can be very long. Some war memorials are dedicated to a specific battle, while others are more general in nature and bear inscriptions listing various theatres of war.
 Many war memorials have epitaphs relating to the unit, battle or war they commemorate. For example, an epitaph which adorns numerous memorials in Commonwealth countries is "The Ode" by Laurence Binyon:
They shall grow not old, as we that are left grow old.
Age shall not weary them, nor the years condemn.
At the going down of the sun and in the morning
We will remember them.
 The Memorial Arch at the Royal Military College of Canada, which remembers ex-cadets who died on military service includes lines of Rupert Brooke's poem, The Dead:

Blow out, you bugles, over the rich Dead.
There are none of these so lonely and poor of old,
But dying has made us rarer gifts than gold.
 In the years following the end of World War I a heated debate occurred in the United States as to whether memorials should be the standard sort that were created after the Civil War or a more progressive sort of "living memorials." These consisted of bridges, parks, libraries, playgrounds, community centers, civic auditoriums and athletic fields. Examples include Soldier Field and Veterans Stadium.
 Underwater memorials are serving veterans and Soldiers who served as divers during their wartime missions.

Tank monument
A tank monument or armoured memorial is a tank withdrawn from military service and displayed to commemorate a battle or a military unit.  Obsolete tanks may also be displayed as gate guards outside military bases.

Immediately following the First World War, a number of obsolete tanks were presented to towns and cities throughout Britain for display and for use as memorials: most were scrapped in the 1920s and 1930s, but one that survives is a Mark IV Female tank at Ashford, Kent.

Several Second World War tanks are preserved as memorials to major armoured offensives in the Ardennes, such as the Battle of Sedan and the Battle of the Bulge. These include:
 an Achilles tank destroyer in La Roche
 a Panther tank in the village Celles
 a Sherman tank in the town square of Bastogne
 a Tiger II tank in the village of La Gleize

A plinth-mounted T-35/85 tank commemorates the soldiers of the 5th Guards Tank Army, at Znamianka in Ukraine.

In cemeteries
Many cemeteries tended by the Commonwealth War Graves Commission have an identical war memorial called the Cross of Sacrifice designed by Sir Reginald Blomfield that varies in height from 18 ft to 32 ft depending on the size of the cemetery. If there are one thousand or more burials, a Commonwealth cemetery will contain a Stone of Remembrance, designed by Sir Edwin Lutyens with words from the Wisdom of Sirach: "Their name liveth for evermore"; all the Stones of Remembrance are 11 ft 6 ins long and 5 ft high with three steps leading up to them.

Arlington National Cemetery has a Canadian Cross of Sacrifice with the names of all the citizens of the USA who lost their lives fighting in the Canadian forces during the Korean War and two World Wars.

Controversy
War memorials can sometimes be politically controversial. A notable case is that of the Yasukuni Shrine in Japan, where a number of convicted World War II war criminals are interred. Chinese and Korean representatives have often protested against the visits of Japanese politicians to the shrine. The visits have in the past led to severe diplomatic conflicts between the nations, and Japanese businesses were attacked in China after a visit by former Japanese Prime Minister Junichiro Koizumi to the shrine was widely reported and criticized in Chinese and Korean media.

In a similar case, former German chancellor Helmut Kohl was criticised by writers Günter Grass and Elie Wiesel for visiting the war cemetery at Bitburg (in the company of Ronald Reagan) which also contained the bodies of SS troops. Unlike the case of the Yasukuni Shrine, there was no element of intentional disregard of international opinion involved, as is often claimed for the politician visits to the Japanese shrine.

Soviet World War II memorials included quotes of Joseph Stalin's texts, frequently replaced after his death. Such memorials were often constructed in city centres and now are sometimes regarded as symbols of Soviet occupation and removed, which in turn may spark protests (see Bronze Soldier of Tallinn).

The Fusiliers' memorial arch to the Royal Dublin Fusiliers who fought in the Boer War, erected at 1907 in St. Stephen's Green, Dublin, was called "Traitors' Gate" by the Redmondites and later Irish Republicans, from whose point of view Irish soldiers going off to fight the British Empire's wars were traitors to Ireland. The sharpness of the controversy gradually faded, and while the term "Traitors' Gate" is still in occasional colloquial use in Dublin daily life, it has mostly lost its pejorative meaning.

In Australia, in 1981, historian Henry Reynolds raised the issue of whether war memorials should be erected to Indigenous Australians who had died fighting against British invaders on their lands.
How, then, do we deal with the Aboriginal dead? White Australians frequently say that 'all that' should be forgotten. But it will not be. It cannot be. Black memories are too deeply, too recently scarred. And forgetfulness is a strange prescription coming from a community which has revered the fallen warrior and emblazoned the phrase 'Lest We Forget' on monuments throughout the land. [...] [D]o we make room for the Aboriginal dead on our memorials, cenotaphs, boards of honour and even in the pantheon of national heroes? If we are to continue to celebrate the sacrifice of men and women who died for their country can we deny admission to fallen tribesmen? There is much in their story that Australians have traditionally admired. They were ever the underdogs, were always outgunned, yet frequently faced death without flinching. If they did not die for Australia as such they fell defending their homelands, their sacred sites, their way of life. What is more the blacks bled on their own soil and not half a world away furthering the strategic objectives of a distant Motherland whose influence must increasingly be seen as of transient importance in the history of the continent.
Reynolds' suggestion proved controversial. Occasional memorials have been erected to commemorate Aboriginal people's resistance to colonisation, or to commemorate white massacres of Indigenous Australians. These memorials have often generated controversy. For example, a 1984 memorial to the Kalkadoon people's "resistance against the paramilitary force of European settlers and the Queensland Native Mounted Police" was "frequently shot at" and "eventually blown up".

With the advent of long war, some memorials are constructed before the conflict is over, leaving space for extra names of the dead.  For instance, the Northwood Gratitude and Honor Memorial in Irvine, CA, memorializes an ongoing pair of US wars, and has space to inscribe the names of approximately 8,000 fallen servicemembers, while the UK National Memorial Arboretum near Lichfield in England hosts the UK's National Armed Forces Memorial which displays the names of the more than 16,000 people who have already died on active service in the UK armed forces since World War II, with more space available for future fatalities.

List of war memorials

Africa

Egypt
 Unknown Soldier Memorial (Egypt)
 Port Said Martyrs Memorial

Somaliland
Hargeisa War Memorial

Americas

Brazil
 Monument to the dead of World War II
 Monument to the Expeditionary

Canada
 List of Canadian war memorials

Falkland Islands
 1982 Liberation Memorial

United States
 The Hiker (Kitson) and The Hiker (Newman)
 Indiana World War Memorial Plaza
 Iron Mike
 Korean War Veterans Memorial
 Liberation (Holocaust memorial)
 Liberty Memorial
 List of memorials to the Grand Army of the Republic
 List of Confederate monuments and memorials
 List of monuments of the Gettysburg Battlefield
 List of Union Civil War monuments and memorials
 Middle East Conflicts Wall Memorial
 National Cemetery
 Navy – Merchant Marine Memorial
 Northwood Gratitude and Honor Memorial
 Prison Ship Martyrs' Monument
 Soldier Field
 Spirit of the American Doughboy
 Spirit of the American Navy
 Tomb of the Unknown Revolutionary War Soldier
 Tomb of the Unknowns
 United States Marine Corps War Memorial
 United States Navy Memorial
 Vietnam Veterans Memorial
 Vietnam Women's Memorial
 World War I Memorial (Kansas City, Missouri)
 World War I Memorial (Washington, D.C.)
 World War II Memorial

Memorial coliseums and stadiums in the United States
 Memorial Coliseum, Lexington, Kentucky
 Memorial Coliseum, Corpus Christi, Texas
 Veterans Memorial Coliseum, Portland, Oregon
 Allen County War Memorial Coliseum, Fort Wayne, Indiana
 Coleman Coliseum, Tuscaloosa, Alabama
 Beard–Eaves–Memorial Coliseum, Auburn, Alabama
 Los Angeles Memorial Coliseum, Los Angeles, California
 Lawrence Joel Veterans Memorial Coliseum, Winston-Salem, North Carolina
 Jacksonville Veterans Memorial Coliseum, Jacksonville, Florida
 VyStar Veterans Memorial Arena, Jacksonville, Florida
 Arizona Veterans Memorial Coliseum, Phoenix, Arizona
 Soldiers and Sailors Memorial Coliseum, Evansville, Indiana
 Nassau Veterans Memorial Coliseum, Uniondale, New York
 New Haven Veterans Memorial Coliseum, New Haven, Connecticut
 Veterans Memorial Coliseum, Marion, Ohio
 Veterans Stadium, Philadelphia, Pennsylvania
 War Memorial Stadium (Buffalo, New York)
 War Memorial Stadium (Arkansas), Little Rock, Arkansas

Asia

Bangladesh 
 Jatiyo Smriti Soudho, Savar, in Bangladesh

China
 Monument to the People's Heroes (Beijing)

Hong Kong
 The Cenotaph (Hong Kong)

India
 Amar Jawan Jyoti (to commemorate the dead and unknown soldiers of the Indian Armed Forces who sacrificed their lives defending India)
 India Gate (Dedicated to the soldiers of the British Indian army)
 Khalanga War Memorial, Dehradun
 National War Memorial, New Delhi (National War Memorial (NWM) at India Gate built on the sprawling lawns of India Gate, in memory of the war heroes of Indian forces)
 War Memorial, Darjeeling

 War Memorial of the 49th Bengalee Regiment, Kolkata (dedicated to the soldiers of 49th Bengali Regiment, who died in World War I)

Iraq
 Al-Shaheed Monument

Israel
 National Memorial Hall (Mount Herzl) (site of Israel's national cemetery and other memorial facilities)
 Yad Vashem (located on the Mount of Remembrance in Jerusalem, dedicated to gentiles who, at personal risk and without a financial or evangelistic motive, chose to save Jews from genocide)
 Garden of the Righteous Among the Nations (dedicated to honor those gentiles who during the Holocaust of World War 2 risked their lives to save Jews)
 Yom Hazikaron ( lit. "The Day of Remembrance" dedicated for the Fallen Soldiers of Israel and Victims of Terrorism)
 Victims of Acts of Terror Memorial
 Israeli casualties of war memorials:
 Davidka memorial
 Memorial for the Defenders of the Old City of Jerusalem
 Beit Lid memorial
 Ashdod Port memorial
 Avivim school bus memorial
 Avshalom Feinberg memorial
 Hill 69 memorial
 Jaffa Road bombing memorial
 Mahal memorial
 Ma'alot memorial
 Six-Day War memorial
 Coastal Road memorial
 Maxim restaurant massacre memorial
 Be'erot Izhak memorial
 Bus suicide bombing memorial in Tel Aviv
 Haganah memorial
 Second Lebanon War memorial
 1948 Arab–Israeli War
 Dolphinarium massacre memorial
 Combat Engineering Corps memorial
 Druze soldiers memorial in Daliyat Al-Karmel
 Olei Hagardom memorial
 Fatality victims of Palestinian rocket attacks memorial
 Beersheba suicide terror attack memorial
 Fallen Israeli policemen memorial
 Memorial for the fallen soldiers of the Israeli Engineering Corp
 Convoy of the Lamed-Heh memorial
 Kiryat Anavim military cemetery
 Independence War Memorial in Kibbutz Malkia
 Yad La-Shiryon (lit. The Armored Corps Memorial Site and Museum at Latrun)

Japan
 Yasukuni Shrine
 Chidorigafuchi National Cemetery

Lebanon
 Mleeta museum

Malaysia
 Tugu Negara (National Monument)

Myanmar
 Taukkyan War Cemetery (British Commonwealth "Burma")

Nepal
 Gurkha Memorial Park, Dharan

Philippines
 Mausoleum of the Veterans of the Revolution

Singapore
 Kranji Memorial

South Korea
 The War Memorial Museum
 Gapyeong Canada Monument

Thailand
 Victory Monument

United Arab Emirates
 Oasis of Dignity

Europe

Austria
 Soviet war memorial (Vienna)

Belarus
 Brest Fortress (Brest)
 Khatyn massacre

Belgium
  (Liège)
 Menin Gate Memorial (Ypres)
 Saint Julien Memorial (Langemark)
 Island of Ireland Peace Park (Messines)
 Lion's Mound (Waterloo)

Croatia
 Petrova Gora Monument
 Slabinja Monument

Denmark
 Jutland Memorial park

Estonia
 Independence War Victory Column (Tallinn)

France
 Beaumont-Hamel Newfoundland Memorial Park
 Douaumont Ossuary Verdun
 Welsh Memorial at Mametz Wood
 Notre Dame de Lorette
 Verdun Memorial
 Villers–Bretonneux Australian National Memorial (Australian World War I Memorial)
 Vimy Ridge Memorial (Canadian World War I Memorial)
 Thiepval Memorial to the Missing of the Somme (British World War I Memorial)
 Normandy American Cemetery and Memorial (USA World War II Memorial)
 see also Monuments aux Morts

Germany
 Tannenberg memorial
 Völkerschlachtdenkmal
 Befreiungshalle
 Hermannsdenkmal
 Soviet War Memorial (Treptower Park)
 Neue Wache Berlin
 Prussian National Monument for the Liberation Wars
 Aegidienkirche, Hanover, church ruined in World War II, with a Hiroshima peace bell

Ireland
 Garden of Remembrance "all those who gave their lives in the cause of Irish Freedom" (1798–1921)
 Irish National War Memorial Gardens "to the memory of the 49,400 Irish soldiers who gave their lives in the Great War, 1914–1918"

Italy
 Redipuglia War Memorial
 Asiago War Memorial
 Sacrario militare di Pocol
 Sacrario militare dei Caduti Oltremare di Bari

Latvia
 Freedom Monument

Malta
 Malta Memorial
 War Memorial

Netherlands
 National Monument (Amsterdam)
 Waalsdorpervlakte
 Erebegraafplaats Bloemendaal
 Netherlands American Cemetery
 Groesbeek Memorial, Canadian War Cemetery
 Liberty Monument Welberg (Welberg (Steenbergen))

Poland
 Tomb of the Unknown Soldier
 Westerplatte Monument
 Warsaw Uprising Monument
 Mały Powstaniec
 Monument to the Heroes of Warsaw
 Monument to the Ghetto Heroes
 Monument to the Polish Underground State and Home Army
 Monument to the Fallen and Murdered in the East
 Monument to the Battle of Monte Cassino in Warsaw

Romania
 Mausoleum of Mărăşeşti
 Tomb of the Unknown Soldier

Russia
 Tomb of the Unknown Soldier (Moscow)
 Piskarevskoye Memorial Cemetery (Siege of Leningrad)
 Poklonnaya Hill (Battle of Moscow)
 Mamayev Kurgan (Battle of Stalingrad)

Slovenia
 Tomb of National Heroes (Ljubljana)
 Vojko's Plaque
 Monument to the Victims of All Wars
 List of World War II monuments and memorials in Slovenia
 Monuments to the Slovene Partisans

Spain
 Fossar de les Moreres
 Valle de los Caídos (Valley of the Fallen)

Switzerland
 Lion Monument

Turkey
 Monument of Liberty, Istanbul
 Aviation Martyrs' Monument
 Balkan Wars Memorial Cemetery in Edirne
 Çanakkale Martyrs' Memorial
 57th Infantry Regiment Memorial
 Respect to Mehmetçik Monument
 Atatürk and Şerife Bacı Monument
 Victory Monument (Ankara)
 Cyprus Memorial Forest in Silifke

UK
 Animals in War Memorial
 The National Armed Forces Memorial in Alrewas, Staffordshire
 The Cenotaph, Whitehall, London
 The Cenotaph, Belfast
 Commando Memorial, Spean Bridge, Highland
 Great Eastern Railway War Memorial, at Liverpool Street station (to the east)
 Great Western Railway War Memorial, at Paddington station (to the west)
 Hall of Memory, Birmingham
 Lewis War Memorial, Stornoway, Western Isles
 London, Brighton and South Coast Railway War Memorial, at London Bridge station (to the south east)
 Battle of Maiwand, Reading
 Midland Railway War Memorial, in Derby
 War memorials in Monmouth, Wales
 National Firefighters Memorial
 North Eastern Railway War Memorial, in York
 Northern Ireland War Memorial
 Scottish National War Memorial, Edinburgh Castle, City of Edinburgh
 Scottish War Memorials
 Shot at Dawn Memorial
 Southampton Cenotaph Lutyens first memorial
 The Unknown Warrior in Westminster Abbey
 Welsh National War Memorial, Cardiff
 Women of World War II, London

Oceania

Australia
 ANZAC War Memorial (Sydney)
 Australian War Memorial (Canberra)
 Fremantle War Memorial (Fremantle)
 Great Ocean Road (Victoria)
 Hobart Cenotaph (Hobart)
 State War Memorial (Perth)
 National War Memorial (Adelaide)
 Shrine of Remembrance (Brisbane), and World War I memorials in Queensland
 Shrine of Remembrance (Melbourne)
 Mount Macedon Memorial Cross (Mount Macedon)

New Zealand
 Auckland War Memorial Museum
 National War Memorial (Wellington)

See also
 Alexander Carrick (Scottish sculptor responsible for several Scottish war memorials)
 Avenue of Honour
 Battlefield Cross (To honor an individual soldier)
 Commemorative plaque
 Mausolea
 Peace movement
 Removal of Confederate monuments and memorials
 Tomb of the Unknown Soldier (memorials specifically dedicated to unknown soldiers)
 Tropaeum Traiani, in Romania
 UK National Inventory of War Memorials (online database listing all war memorials in the UK)
 War Memorials Trust (UK charity that gives free advice about and grants towards war memorial conservation)
 War Memorial Stadium (for list of stadiums so named in the United States)

References

External links

General
 Sites of Memory (Historical markers, memorials, monuments, and cemeteries worldwide)

France
 Mémorial pacifist in French
 Queutchny1418 (As of 26 April 2014, more than 5240 pictures of 1914–1918 memorials)(in French)
 Mémorial-GenWeb (French war memorials (photos and inscriptions), in French)

Germany
 German war memorials (photos and inscriptions), in German
 Remembering The Reich (German World War II and Holocaust memorials, private travel blog entry)

Ireland
 Irish War Memorials, (An inventory of war memorials in Ireland)

Japan
 Kamikaze Images – Monuments, (monuments for WWII Special Attack Forces including Kamikaze Corps)

United Kingdom
 Architecture (from the Commonwealth War Graves Commission website)
 UK War Memorials Register (the comprehensive national register of over 68,000 UK war memorials and the names of over 900,000 of the individuals they commemorate)
 Scottish War Memorials Project (public access forum recording all of Scotland's War Memorials)
 Charity recording North East War Memorials including names and images.

United States
 United States Navy Memorial (including Navy Log and naval history information)
 Vietnam Unit Memorial Monument, (Coronado California)

Aftermath of war
Memorials, war
 
Types of monuments and memorials